Iron horse is an iconic literary term (considered by the early 21st century to be transitioning into an archaic reference) for a steam locomotive, originating in the early 1800s, when horses still powered most machinery.<ref name="randomhouse"></re</ref> The term was common and popular in both British and North American literary articles.

Use of the term

Origin
Iron horse was used admiringly when comparing early road and railroad traction engine performance to slower, less powerful horse-powered tramways. The iron horse term became widely popularized and found frequent use in the century and a half following the competition won by Stephenson's Rocket, in innumerable newspaper articles as well as in various novels. The term's place as a cultural icon is shown by the sheer number of things named after it, its use in films and other media, and as a term of endearment.

Decline
It began to decline in use, at least in North American colloquial expression, or as a reference term of art in the information industries, with the decline in rail passenger service in the age of the U.S. Interstate Highway System.

References

Steam locomotives
Western (genre) staples and terminology

pt:Iron horse